Dongfeng Mengshi is a family of 4×4 MRAP/off-road vehicles developed by Dongfeng Motor Group. Early generations of the vehicle are built with imported Hummer H1 chassis, while later generations of the vehicles are of indigenous design. Dongfeng Mengshi generally follows the trend of American military requirements. For example, CSK-141 is the Chinese equivalent of an armor-plated reinforced Humvee, while CSK-181 is the Chinese equivalent of the Joint Light Tactical Vehicle.

EQ2050

CSK-131

Dongfeng CSK131 is Chinese light protected vehicle developed by Dongfeng Corporation. The chassis has been completely redesigned from EQ2060 with new engine and electronics including onboard computers with digital map software and Beidou satellite communication and positioning system, one night-vision camera for driver and one for the rear door. It's one of the two principal light armored vehicle currently fielded by PLA. All CSK-131 are equipped with a manually controlled turret.

Dimensions and weight
Weight (gross): 
Weight (curb): 
Payload capacity: 
Towing capacity: 
Length: 
Width: 
Height:

Variants
CSK-131 Command Post Command post vehicle with communication suite on board.
CSK-131 Armored Reconnaissance Vehicle Armaments include 12.7 mm machines guns and 35 mm automatic grenade launcher on a remote weapon station. The variant has a data-link, all-weather monitoring, and a retractable mast equipped with electro-optical sensor and radar. The vehicle is capable of conduct combat reconnaissance mission as well as providing fire support guidance for artillery.
TL-4 mounted missile system Based on CSK-131 chassis, the variant is equipped with four TL-4 fire-and-forget anti-tank missiles.

CSK-141 (CS/VN11)
Dongfeng CSK141 is a Chinese light protected vehicle developed by Dongfeng Corporation. Although sharing a lot of similarities to the CSK-131, the chassis of CSK-141 has a much longer wheelbase with a longer crew cabin having space for 10 infantry. CSK141 shares similar electronics with CSK131 such as computer, satellite suite and night vision cameras. This vehicle features unusual clamshell doors on either side which the door divide into upper and lower part. It's one of the two principal light armored vehicle currently fielded by PLA. All CSK-141 are equipped with a remote-controlled turret that can be mounted with machine guns, anti-tank missile and grenade launchers. The Dongfeng EQ2101 variants features a 6x6 configuration, and the CS/VN11 is the export version. First released in 2016, CS/VN11 has conventional side doors instead of clamshell type side doors.

Dimensions and weight
Weight (gross): 
Weight (curb): 
Payload capacity: 
Towing capacity: 
Length: 
Width: 
Height:

EQ2111
EQ2111 is the prototype for next generation MRAP light tactical vehicle.

Dimensions and weight
Weight (curb): 
Payload capacity: 
Length: 
Width: 
Height:

CSK-182
CSK-182 is the shorter version of CSK-181 with six seats including one driver and one weapon station operator. It's based on EQ2111.

CSK-181

CSK-181 is the new generation of light tactical vehicle developed by Dongfeng for PLA. CSK-181 is based on CSK-141 with one driver, one weapon station operator as co-driver with eight infantry seats. The variant has improved satellite communication capability, longer range night-vision cameras and most importantly, Mine-Resistant Ambush Protection capability. All CSK-181 are equipped with a remote-controlled turret, which can be mounted with machine guns, anti-tank missile and grenade launchers. The vehicle is in service as of 2020.

Dimensions and weight
Crew: 2 (driver and weapon station operator)
Passengers: 8
Weight (total): 
Weight (curb): 
Payload capacity: 
Towing capacity: 
Length: 
Width: 
Height (without turret): 
Maximum speed: 
Minimum speed:

Variants
 CSK-181 C2 CSK-181 based command and control (C2) vehicle.
 CSK-181 ATGM CSK-181 based ATGM carrier. Fitted with sensors and unknown type of ATGM. HJ-11 or AFT-11, an improved derivative of HJ-8 missile, is estimated to be the missile mounted on CSK-181.

CTL181/CTL181A
CTL181 and CTL181A are light protected trucks modified on CSK-181 chassis.

Dimensions and weight (CTL181)
6x6 all wheel drive
Weight (total): 
Weight (curb): 
Payload capacity: 
Towing capacity: 
Length: 
Width: 
Height:

Variants
 PCL-171 122mm truck-mounted howitzer (self-propelled howitzer, SPH) capable of rapid deployment. The vehicle chassis is based on CTL-181A.
 CTL-181A ATMC Fitted with four HJ-10 anti-tank missile and electro-optical sensors. 
 CTL-181A Mortar Carrier Fitted with vehicle-mounted 120 mm mortar and ammunition storage unit.
 CTL-181A Multiple Rocket Launcher Fitted with vehicle-mounted 122 mm multiple rocket launcher and ammunition storage unit. 
 CTL-181A Assault Bridge Builder It is equipped with a vehicle-launched bridge at the back.
 CTL-181A UAV Swarm Fitted with a multiple launch system capable of launching small UAV/loitering munition.

CSZ181
CSZ181 is the protected support vehicle variant in a box truck form.

Dimensions and weight (CSZ181)
6x6 all wheel drive
Weight (total): 
Weight (curb): 
Payload capacity: 
Towing capacity: 
Length: 
Width: 
Height:

Variants
 CSZ-181 MEDVAC medical evacuation vehicle based on the CSZ181 chassis.

M20

M-Terrain

See also
Humvee clone manufacturing in China
MRAP
BJ2022
Vehicles of comparable roles
 Joint Light Tactical Vehicle
 Humvee
 GAZ Tigr
 Kamaz Typhoon
 Bushmaster Protected Mobility Vehicle
 Hawkei

References

Military vehicles of the People's Republic of China
Dongfeng vehicles
Off-road vehicles
All-wheel-drive vehicles